Rajapalayam is a City in the Indian state of Tamil Nadu. It is the largest municipality in the Virudhunagar district. Rajapalayam is located in the Madurai to Quilon National Highway at a distance of 562 km south to the state capital Chennai. Economy is based on textile manufacture: the town has several mills for spinning and weaving cotton, as well as a large cotton market. The town is also famed for Rajapalayam mango and the Rajapalayam breed of dogs.

Climate 
The climate of the region is of the semi-arid tropical monsoon type. The average temperature range is 20 °C to 37 °C.

Demographics

According to the 2011 census, Rajapalayam had a population of 130,442 with 1,014 females for every 1,000 males, far above the national average of 929. A total of 11,604 individuals (5,927 males and 5,677 females) were under the age of six. Scheduled Castes and Scheduled Tribes accounted for 13.51% and 0.09% of the population respectively. The average literacy of the city was 77.87%; the national average was 72.99%. The city had a total of 37,797 households. There were 53,913 workers, comprising 380 cultivators, 3,676 main agricultural labourers, 1,375 in household industries, 45,223 other workers, 3,259 marginal workers, 34 marginal cultivators, 326 marginal agricultural labourers, 286 marginal workers in household industries and 2,613 other marginal workers. According to the religious census of 2011, the population was 94.53% Hindu, 3.48% Muslim, 1.75% Christian, 0.02% Sikh and 0.21% other.

Geography
The mountains of the Western ghats are to the west of the city (12 km from the city), and the Sanjeevi hills are to the east. These moderate the climate, and several water catchment areas in the hills provide water for the city. Water is stored in the 6th mile water reservoir. There are several major lakes around the city, including Kondanerigf, Karungulam, Pirandaikulam, and Sengulam. The soil in the area is classified by the government as red loam.

Industries
The principal industry was initially agriculture. In 1936, Thiru P. A. C. Ramasamy Raja started the first cotton spinning mill, called Rajapalayam Mills Ltd. Later, more textile mills were started including Sree Karpagambal Mills Ltd. Today, Rajapalayam is a major hub of the textile industry, famous for bandages, woven fabric, nightwear, and other products. The neighboring town of Chatrapatti (Virudhunagar Dist) is a large player in producing surgical cotton gauze, and nearby Dhalavaipuram and Muhavoor produce women's nightwear.

Transportation

By Land

Road
The National Highway NH-744 from Madurai to Kollam passes through the city. State highway SH-41 (Rajapalayam-Sankarankovil-Tirunelveli) links the major parts of the extreme south of Tamil Nadu, including Tirunelveli, Tuticorin and Kanyakumari. The road also offers good freight connectivity to Tamil Nadu's second largest seaport, Tuticorin.  State highway SH-186 (Rajapalayam-Vembakottai) connects the town to the east part of Virudhunagar district and passes through the fast-growing industrial towns of Chatrapatti and Alangulam.

Bus

Rajapalayam's long-distance bus station, located on Sankarankovil Road, is served by buses from the government of Tamil Nadu's TNSTC (Tamil Nadu State Transport Corporation) and private transport companies. Buses run to Chennai, Bangalore, Coimbatore, Trichy and other major cities. Several Private bus services run to Chennai, Bangalore, Coimbatore from Rajapalayam. 

Rajapalayam old bus station is the boarding point for buses connecting nearby villages. It is also called Old bus stand or Town bus stand. SankaranKovil Mukku road connects the new bus stand.

Rail

The Rajapalayam railway station is in the Southern Railways zone/Madurai division of Indian Railways and falls on the Virudhunagar to Kollam line. The station code is RJPM.

Passenger Trains running daily via Rajapalayam:

Below Mail/SF Express services are currently running through Rajapalayam Railway station.

By Air
The nearest International airport is Madurai Airport (~80 km).

Notable people 

 P. S. Kumaraswamy Raja (Former Chief Minister of Tamil Nadu (1949–52) and Governor of Orissa (1954–56)
 S. Peter Alphonse (Indian politician, Indian National Congress elected to Tamil Nadu legislative assembly twice from Tenkasi constituency in 1989 & 1991 and once Kadayanallur constituency in 2006
 Shiva Ayyadurai
 Vijay Sethupathi
 Samuthirakani
 Rajakumaran
 Vasanthabalan

References

External links
 Rajapalayam

Cities and towns in Virudhunagar district
Palayam